Ugochukwu Michael "Hugo" Enyinnaya (born May 8, 1981, in Warri) is a retired Nigerian footballer.

Career
Enyinnaya started his career with Eagle Cement, where he made his debut at the age of 16. He was then loaned out to FC Ebedei, being subsequently signed in the summer of 1998 by Belgian Second Division side Molenbeek. Noted by Carlo Regalia, scout of then-Serie A club Bari, he was then signed in 1999 by the galletti in a 200mln ₤ bid, and initially joined the Under-20 Primavera squad, where he formed a striking partnership with a young Antonio Cassano. He marked his Serie A debut on 17 October 1999 in a home match against Torino. On 18 December he was first featured in the starting lineup, together with Cassano, in a home league match against Internazionale, which ended in a surprising 2–1 win for Bari thanks to goals from Enyinnaya (a 30-meter shot during the 7th minute) and a late winner by Cassano.

Enyinnaya later failed to gain a spot in the regular lineup, unlike Cassano. In 2002 he was loaned to Serie B side Livorno, where he scored only two goals in 17 matches. He returned to Bari in 2003, but failed to impress, being loaned again, this time to Serie C1's Foggia, in January 2004. In July 2004 his contract expired, and Enyinnaya subsequently joined Górnik Zabrze under request by then-chairman Marek Koźmiński. Adaptation difficulties however affected his performances, and Enyinnaya played only 7 times with the Polish side. He then left Gornik, joining Poland II Liga club Lechia Zielona Góra in 2005 and after that Odra Opole.

In January 2009 Enyinnaya returned to Italy by accepting an offer from amateur Eccellenza club A.S.D. Anziolavinio. In July 2009 he moved to another Eccellenza club, Meda.

References

Sources

Profile at Lega Calcio

1981 births
Living people
Igbo sportspeople
Nigerian footballers
Nigerian expatriate footballers
Association football forwards
Sportspeople from Warri
R.W.D. Molenbeek players
S.S.C. Bari players
U.S. Livorno 1915 players
Calcio Foggia 1920 players
Górnik Zabrze players
Serie A players
Serie B players
Belgian Pro League players
Odra Opole players
F.C. Ebedei players
Dolphin F.C. (Nigeria) players
A.C. Meda 1913 players
Nigerian expatriate sportspeople in Italy
Nigerian expatriate sportspeople in Belgium
Nigerian expatriate sportspeople in Poland
Expatriate footballers in Italy
Expatriate footballers in Belgium
Expatriate footballers in Poland